{

Broom Villa is a Grade II listed building at 27 Broomhouse Road, Fulham, London. It was built in the early 19th century.

References

Houses in the London Borough of Hammersmith and Fulham
Grade II listed houses in London
Grade II listed buildings in the London Borough of Hammersmith and Fulham